West Forsyth High School may refer to:

 West Forsyth High School (North Carolina) in Clemmons, North Carolina
 West Forsyth High School (Georgia) in Cumming, Georgia

simple:West Forsyth High School